C->U-editing enzyme APOBEC-4, also known as Apolipoprotein B mRNA-editing enzyme catalytic polypeptide-like 4, is a protein that in humans is encoded by the APOBEC4 gene. It is primarily expressed in testis and found in mammals, chicken, but not fishes.

Function 

This gene encodes a member of the AID / APOBEC family of polynucleotide (deoxy)cytidine deaminases, which convert cytidine to uridine. Other AID/APOBEC family members are involved in mRNA editing, somatic hypermutation and recombination of immunoglobulin genes, and innate immunity to retroviral infection.

A recent study on APOBEC4 (A4) revealed an interesting finding that A4 enhanced the replication of HIV-1 through boosting promoter activity, it also increased the expression of other relevant promoter mediated enhanced protein expression. Biochemical analysis of A4 showed the lack of cytidine deaminase activity on single stranded DNA and it binds DNA rather weak.

References

External links

Further reading 

 

EC 3.5.4